Jalaluddin Abdur Rahim (Urdu: جلال الدين عبدالرحيم; Bengali: জালালুদ্দিন আবদুর রহিম; also known as J. A. Rahim) (27 July 1906 – 1977) was a Bengali communist and political philosopher who was renowned as one of the founding members of the Pakistan People's Party—a democratic socialist political party. Rahim was also the first Secretary-General of the Pakistan People's Party, served as the first minister of production. A Bengali civil servant, Rahim was a philosopher who politically guided Zulfikar Ali Bhutto, serving as his mentor, and had helped Bhutto navigate through the minefield of bureaucratic establishment when Ayub Khan had taken Bhutto into his cabinet. Rahim also guided Bhutto after Bhutto was deposed as Foreign Minister, critically guiding Bhutto to take down the once US-sponsored dictatorship of Ayub Khan.

Family and education
Educated at the University of Dhaka where Rahim received double BSc in Political Science and Philosophy after writing and publishing the brief thesis on Nietzsche Philosophy.  Later, Rahim attended Calcutta University, receiving an LL.B. degree in Law and Justice. Rahim began his political activism in Pakistan Movement, serving as its activist in East Bengal. His father, Justice Abdur Rahim also had served as a senior associate judge at the Supreme Court of Pakistan.

Career
After his education, Rahim joined the Pakistan Civil Services, picking up the first bureaucratic assignment in Foreign Service of Pakistan. Rahim served as the Foreign Secretary under the government of Prime minister Muhammad Ali Bogra.

For some time, he remained associated with Communist party, but also built personal relations with Zulfikar Ali Bhutto in 1965. After attending the socialist convention at the residence of Dr. Mubashir Hassan, J. A. Rahim played a key role in writing the party's socialist manifesto: "Islam is our religion; democracy is our politics; socialism is our economy; power lies with the people", on 30 November 1967. This manifesto was officially first issued on 9 December 1967. J.A. Rahim was made Pakistan Peoples Party's first secretary general after writing the party's constitution.

Rahim earned public notability after his name was announced as a Bengali member of delegation of Pakistan Peoples Party to launch a negotiation with Awami League party under Sheikh Mujibur Rahman. In 1970, Rahim along with Ghulam Mustafa Khar, returned to West Pakistan, telling Bhutto that the "meeting with Mujib was of no use". After the 1971 war, Rahim stayed in what remained of Pakistan, governing the Law ministry, Justice minister, and the Township planning and agrovilles. In 1972, Rahim was appointed as the first Minister of Defence Production which he governed until 1974.

Disillusionment with Bhutto
His relations with Bhutto deteriorated after Pakistan People's Party began purging the radical and ultra-left wings of the party and J. A. Rahim was also lined by Bhutto later. 
 
In July 1974, Rahim himself got disillusioned with Bhutto after seeing Bhutto's handling of internal affairs and publicly disagreed with Bhutto as he wanted Bhutto to deal with the matters efficiently, not by force.

He was appointed Pakistan Ambassador to France by Bhutto just to get him out of the way and away from Pakistani politics. But he returned to Pakistan unscheduled.  Rahim was then tortured by the members of the secret police, the Federal Security Force (FSF), and was thrown into jail in 1976. Shortly afterwards, he was released. Later after Bhutto had formally issued an apology to him, he again left for France to complete his tenure as ambassador. Some people say that Bhutto, during his final days, regretted his fall-out with his former mentor, J. A. Rahim.

Death
In 1977, Rahim suffered a heart attack and died. He is now buried in Karachi, Sindh, Pakistan.

See also
Bangladesh Liberation War
Left-wing politics in Pakistan
Pakistan-United States relations
Pakistan-Soviet Union relations

References

Pakistani communists
1906 births
1977 deaths
20th-century Bengalis
Pakistani civil servants
Pakistan People's Party politicians
Bangladesh Liberation War
University of Dhaka alumni
University of Calcutta alumni
Pakistan Movement activists
Pakistani people of Bengali descent
Ambassadors of Pakistan to France
20th-century Pakistani philosophers
Bengali philosophers
Bengali communists
Grand Crosses 1st class of the Order of Merit of the Federal Republic of Germany
People from Chittagong District